Atwell is an unincorporated community in the southeast corner of Miller County, in the U.S. state of Missouri. The community is on a low ridge between Atwell Creek to the east and Little Tavern Creek to the west. Access is by Missouri Route K from Missouri Route 17. Iberia is 5.5 miles to the northwest.

History
A post office called Atwell was established in 1894, and remained in operation until 1910. The community has the name of John T. Atwell, the original owner of the site.

References

Unincorporated communities in Miller County, Missouri
Unincorporated communities in Missouri